The Prussian Spy is a 1909 American silent short drama film directed by D. W. Griffith.

Cast
 Marion Leonard as Lady Florence
 Harry Solter as Count Lopes
 Owen Moore as The Spy
 Arthur V. Johnson as Soldier
 Florence Lawrence as The Maid
 David Miles as Soldier
 Mack Sennett as Soldier

References

External links
 

1909 films
1909 drama films
1909 short films
Silent American drama films
American silent short films
American black-and-white films
Films directed by D. W. Griffith
Franco-Prussian War films
1900s American films